E. V. Ramakrishnan is an English-Malayalam bilingual writer, poet and literary critic from Kerala, India. He received several awards including the Kerala Sahitya Akademi Award for Literary Criticism and the Odakkuzhal Award.

Biography
Born on March 23, 1951, at Valayankot near Payyannur in Kannur district. After educated at Payyannur College, Government Brennen College and Devagiri College, he obtained his PhD from Marathwada University, Aurangabad (Maharashtra). He worked as lecturer in English at Jalna, Maharashtra in 1973-84 and then Lecturer in the Department of English at South Gujarat University, Surat from 1985. He is now working as Emeritus Professor in Central University of Gujarat.

The book Indian short stories : (1900-2000), edited by him and published by Sahitya Akademi has been translated to Tamil with title Indiya Chirukathaigal.

Works

Poetry collections

 Being Elsewhere in Myself (1980)
 Tips for Living in an Expanding Universe

Literary criticism

Literary Criticism in India: Texts, Trends and Trajectories, published by the Sahitya Akademi.

Malayala Novelinte Desa Kalangal (in Malayalam)
Viyojippinte vangmayangal, DC Books, 2021 (in Malayalam)
 (with Anju Makhija)
 (with Lakshmi Bandlamudi)

As editor

Awards and honours
Kerala Sahitya Akademi Award for Literary Criticism for the work Aksharavum Adhunikathayum (1995)
Odakkuzhal Award for his work Malayala Novelinte Desa Kalangal (2018)
Dr. T. Bhaskaran Memorial Vaikhari Award for his work Malayala Novelinte Desa Kalangal
Prof. CVN Literary Award for the work Malayala Novelinte Desa Kalangal (2022)
U.G.C Career Award for young scholars (1987)
Fellowship from Indian Institute of Advanced Study (1993)
Fellowship from K. K. Birla Foundation (1999)
Fulbright Fellowship (2001)
Government of Canada Fellowship (2012)

References

External links
An Interview with E. V. Ramakrishnan

1951 births
Living people
People from Kannur district
Malayali people
Recipients of the Kerala Sahitya Akademi Award
20th-century Indian male writers
Indian literary critics
Malayalam-language writers
Malayalam literary critics
Malayalam poets
English poets
20th-century Indian poets
Poets from Kerala